The Iron Rider is a 1920 American silent Western film directed by Scott R. Dunlap and starring William Russell, Vola Vale and Clark Comstock.

Cast
 William Russell asLarry Lannigan
 Vola Vale as Mera Donovan
 Arthur Morrison as Jim Mason
 Wadsworth Harris as Sheriff Donovan
 George Nichols as John Lannigan

References

Bibliography
 Solomon, Aubrey. The Fox Film Corporation, 1915-1935: A History and Filmography. McFarland, 2011.

External links
 

1920 films
1920 Western (genre) films
American black-and-white films
Films directed by Scott R. Dunlap
Fox Film films
Silent American Western (genre) films
1920s English-language films
1920s American films